Carolina Moraes (born 5 April 1980) is a former synchronized swimmer from Brazil. Both also competed for Ohio State University, winning 11 national championships, including the team routine title in 2000, and four straight titles in duet and trio routines between 1999 and 2002. Following the Olympics, Carolina and Isabela retired and joined Cirque du Soleil, with their first performance being as part of the 2005 World Aquatics Championships opening ceremony. Both have been  part of the cast of Le Rêve, a show presented in Las Vegas since 2007, though Carolina is less frequent as she travels with her husband, part of Cirque du Soleil's technical team.

References 

1980 births
Living people
Brazilian synchronized swimmers
Ohio State Buckeyes women's swimmers
Olympic synchronized swimmers of Brazil
Pan American Games medalists in synchronized swimming
Synchronized swimmers at the 2000 Summer Olympics
Synchronized swimmers at the 2004 Summer Olympics
Pan American Games bronze medalists for Brazil
Synchronized swimmers at the 1999 Pan American Games
Synchronized swimmers at the 2003 Pan American Games
Medalists at the 1999 Pan American Games
21st-century Brazilian people